Epepeotes ceramensis is a species of beetle in the family Cerambycidae. It was described by James Thomson in 1860. It is known from Moluccas.

References

ceramensis
Beetles described in 1860